Skinner may refer to:

People and fictional characters
Skinner (surname), a list of people and fictional characters with that surname
Skinner (profession), a person who makes a living by working with animal skins or driving mules
Skinner, a ring name of professional wrestler Steve Keirn in early 1990s
B. F. Skinner, American Psychologist

American geography
Skinner, Missouri, an unincorporated community
Skinner Butte, a prominent hill beside the Willamette River in Oregon
Skinner Reservoir, a reservoir in Riverside County, California

Other uses
Skinner (film), a 1993 horror film
The Skinner, a 2002 science fiction novel by Neal Asher
Skinner, Inc., also known as Skinner, an auction house for fine art and antiques
The Colour Identification Guide to Moths of the British Isles, referred to as Skinner, by Bernard Skinner

See also
Skinners (disambiguation)